Mông Dương is a ward of Cẩm Phả city in Quảng Ninh Province, Vietnam. It is the site of the Mông Dương thermal power plant projects designed to reduce Vietnam's dependence on hydropower.

Mông Dương power project
State-owned Electricity of Việt Nam (EVN) plans 2,200 MW of coal-fired power stations at Mông Dương.

 Mông Dương I Thermal Power Plant (1,000 MW) was ADB part financed. The financing framework was signed in 2007. The plant required a total investment of US$1.1 billion. NTP 15-Dec-2011, #1 COD 15-Apr-2015, #2 COD 15-Oct-2015.
Final Completion Ceremony at Site was on 16-Jan-2016.
- Boiler Type : CFB (Foster Wheeler China)
- Capacity : 250MW * 4 units

Mông Dương II will sell electricity to Vietnam Electricity (EVN) under a 25-year power purchase agreement (PPA) denominated in US dollars and allowing for a fuel cost pass through, protecting foreign investors from fluctuations in coal prices. NTP was on 7-Aug-2011, #1 COD was on (Plan/Actual) 04-Dec-2014/09-Mar-2015, #2 COD was on (Plan/Actual) 02-Jun-2015/24-Apr-2015. Final Completion Ceremony was on Hanoi Marriot Hotel, 26-Oct-2015.
- Boiler Type : Downshot
- Capacity : 560MW * 2 units

See also
Energy in Vietnam

References

Populated places in Quảng Ninh province
Coal-fired power stations in Vietnam
Buildings and structures in Quảng Ninh province